Torre Vitri or Vitri Tower is a 74-storey residential building located in Costa del Este, Panama City. Completed in 2012, the building is 260 metres (853 feet) tall and is the sixth-tallest building in Panama City and the 11th tallest building in Latin America.

See also 
 List of tallest buildings in Panama City
 List of tallest buildings in Latin America

External links 

 Torre Vitri, Panama City | 244996 | EMPORIS

References 

Residential buildings completed in 2012
Residential skyscrapers in Panama City